The 2022 Țiriac Foundation Trophy was a professional tennis tournament played on outdoor clay courts. It was the seventh edition of the tournament and first as a WTA 125 which is also part of the 2022 WTA 125 tournaments, offering a total of $115,000 in prize money. It took place at the National Tennis Centre in Bucharest, Romania between 12 and 18 September 2022.

Champions

Singles

  Irina-Camelia Begu def.  Réka Luca Jani 6–3, 6–3

Doubles

  Aliona Bolsova /  Andrea Gámiz def.  Réka Luca Jani /  Panna Udvardy 7–5, 6–3

Singles entrants

Seeds 

 1 Rankings are as of 4 September 2022.

Other entrants 
The following players received a wildcard into the singles main draw:
  Irina-Camelia Begu
  Miriam Bulgaru
  Sorana Cîrstea
  Ilona Georgiana Ghioroaie 
  Andreea Roșca
  Ioana Loredana Roșca

The following player received entry into the singles main draw as a special exempt:
  Nuria Brancaccio

The following players qualified into the singles main draw:
  Darya Astakhova
  Aliona Bolsova
  Cristina Dinu
  Rebeka Masarova

The following players received entry as lucky losers:
  María Lourdes Carlé
  İpek Öz

Withdrawals 
Before the tournament
  Mirjam Björklund → replaced by  María Lourdes Carlé
  Jule Niemeier → replaced by  Jaimee Fourlis
  Nuria Párrizas Díaz → replaced by  Erika Andreeva
  Arantxa Rus → replaced by  İpek Öz

Doubles entrants

Seeds 

 1 Rankings as of 5 September 2022.

Other entrants 
The following pair received a wildcard into the doubles main draw:
  Georgia Crăciun /  Cristina Dinu

References 

2022 WTA 125 tournaments
Tennis tournaments in Romania
2022 in Romanian sport
September 2022 sports events in Romania